Old Town is a census-designated place (CDP) in Luna County, New Mexico, United States. It was first listed as a CDP prior to the 2020 census.

The community is on the northern edge of the county, bordered to the north and west by Grant County. It sits on both sides of the Mimbres River as it flows southward towards Deming, the Luna county seat. U.S. Route 180 forms the southern edge of the CDP; the highway leads southeast  to Deming and northwest  to Silver City.

Like other areas in Luna County, it is in the Deming Public Schools school district.

Demographics

References 

Census-designated places in Luna County, New Mexico
Census-designated places in New Mexico